Galentine's Day is a global holiday that celebrates women's friendship. Galentine's Day is typically marked as February 13, but can be observed any day between February 1 and Valentine's Day. Galentine's Day events are typically all-female occasions of mutual "empowerment...a reminder for women to support and uplift one another."   

While Amy Poehler as Leslie Knope is considered by many to be the patron saint of Galentine's Day, the annual festival of sisterhood was imagined into existence by the Parks and Recreation writing staff led by Michael Schur. Galentine's Day merchandise is now sold at mainstream outlets like Walmart, Party City, Amazon and Etsy. Retailers also use the holiday a pretext for organizing pop-up shops marketing products to female customers and resorts and restaurants offer Galentine's themed package deals.

An advice column in a London newspaper described the protocol of Galentine's Day: 

Michelle Obama celebrated Galentine's Day in 2020 and posted a photo on her Instagram and Twitter. The caption read, "This #GalentinesDay, I want to shout out my girlfriends who help me stay sane and grounded through all of life's ups and downs...Whether we're catching up over the phone, venting over a cup of coffee, or laughing it out during an 80s-themed workout, I know I can lean on these ladies—and that's made all the difference." The official Parks & Recreation Twitter replied with a GIF of Leslie Knope expressing approval.

References 

Holidays
Women